Celebrity is a television drama series based on a novel by Thomas Thompson. It was broadcast from February 12, 1984 to February 14, 1984 on NBC.

Plot 
During their days as high school students, the three friends T.J. Luther, Mack Crawford and Kleber Cantrell commit a rape. While one of them rapes the girl, the other two hear the screams of the girl and watch the rape. The girl dies. Luther, Crawford and Cantrell hide the body and promise each other not to speak about this ever again. As grown ups each of them is very successful. One of them is a moviestar, the other one is a famous journalist and the third one a demagogic evangelist. When they meet up again, the meeting  ends in tragedy. One of the friends is shot, the other one is terribly hurt and the third one is the murderer.

Series information 
Celebrity is based on a 1983 novel by Thomas Thompson. The series was filmed in Texas, New York and Los Angeles and is altogether six and a half hours long. In Germany, the UK and North America the series is published on VHS. The series was shown in Spain, Finland, Turkey and Canada.

Cast

Awards and nominations

Nominations 
Primetime Emmy Awards
 1984: Outstanding Cinematography for a Limited Series or a Special (Philip H. Lathrop)

Edgar Allan Poe Awards:
 1985: Best Television Feature or Miniseries (William Hanley)

Critical reception 
John J. Connor (The New York Times) mentions that the series has a strong cast. Furthermore, the series has a great script, which includes the major events during the 1950s, 1960s and 1970s, such as the Vietnam War or the assassination of John F. Kennedy. Tom Shales (The Deseret News) adds that the tale is very well plotted and "irresistible as a good rumor". According to Arthur Unger (Monitor) Celebrity is easy to watch and once started is difficult to stop.

References

External links

1984 American television series debuts
1984 American television series endings
1980s American LGBT-related drama television series
English-language television shows
NBC original programming
Rape in television